Agrawals are the descendent of Maharaja Agrasen who was a legendary Indian king of Agroha, a city of traders. He is the descendant of Kush, son of lord Ram and he was born in 35th generation after lord Ram. He is credited with the establishment of a kingdom of traders in North India named Agroha, and is known for his compassion in refusing to slaughter animals in yajnas.  
Agrawal Jains are an Indian Jain community who originated from Agroha near Hisar, Haryana. In Sanskrit inscriptions and texts, the community is termed Agrotakanvaya.

Legends
According to texts from the Mughal period preserved in Delhi temple libraries, the emergence of the Agrawals is associated with Lohacharya and the Kashtha Sangh. Lohacharya arrived at Agroha in Vikram Samvat 760. He was given food by the local people and he founded the Kashtha Sangh order by installing a wooden idol. The Kashtha Sangh religious order has thus been closely associated with the Agrawal community.

According to some legends, Agrawals were once ruled by a Raja Divakar who was a devout Jain.

History

Agrawal Jains in Delhi
The Agrawal merchant Nattal Sahu and the Agrawal poet Vibudh Shridhar lived during the rule of Tomara Anangapal of Yoginipur (now Mehrauli, near Delhi). Vibudh Shridhar wrote Pasanahacariu in 1132, which includes a historical account of Yoginipur (early Delhi near Mehrauli) then.

In 1354, Firuz Shah Tughluq started the construction of a new city near Agroha called Hisar-e Feroza "Firuz's Fort". Most of the raw material for building the town was brought from Agroha. Hisar was a major center of the Agrawal community.

Some Agrawals rose to good positions in Mughal period, specially during Akbar. Sahu Todar was a supervisor of the royal mint at Agra, who had rebuilt the 514 Jain stupas at Mathura in 1573, during the rule of Akbar.

Sah Ranveer Singh was a royal treasurer during the rule of Akbar. He established the town Saharanpur. His father as well as son and grandson had built several Jain temples, including the one at Kucha Sukhanand in Delhi.

Agrawal Jains in Rajput Kingdoms
Many Agrawals migrated to Rajasthan. They form a large fraction of the merchant population of Shekhawati region. Along with Maheshwari, Khandelwal they form the Marwari bania community.

In the early 15th century, Agrawals flourished as a trader community under the Tomaras of Gwalior.

Historian K.C. Jain comments:

In the 15th century, many Agrawals migrated to Amer kingdom (now Jaipur). In VS 1535, Agrawal Nenasi conducted a Panch-kalyanak Pratishtha ceremony at Sanganer. A copy of Amarsen Chariu copied in VS 1577 at Sonipat was found at Amer, suggesting that Agrawals took sacred texts with them during this migration.

Prachin Shri Agarwal Digambar Jain Panchayat

Seth Girdhari Lal, the son of Raja Shugan Chand, founded the organization Hissar Panipat Agarwal Jain Panchayat. It is now known as Prachin (i.e. old) Shri Agarwal Digambar Jain Panchayat. It is the oldest  Agrawal Jain organization. It has been led by descendants of same family. The organization manages the historical Naya Mandir as well as the Lal Mandir.

The Panchayat has been active in promoting unity among Jains of different sectarian backgrounds.

Notable people
Jinendra Varni compiler of the five volume "Jainendra Siddhanta Kosha" and Saman Suttam compilation.
 Lala Lajpat Rai, Indian independence activist

See also
 Khandelwal Jain
 Shrimal Jain
 Agrasen ki Baoli
 Jainism in Delhi
 Jainism in Bundelkhand

References

Jain communities

Social groups of Rajasthan
Social groups of Haryana
Social groups of Delhi
Social groups of Uttar Pradesh
Social groups of Punjab, India
Social groups of Himachal Pradesh
Social groups of Uttarakhand